Navon (lit. Intelligent) may refer to one of the following:

People
Yitzhak Navon (1921–2015), former President of Israel
Gad Navon (1922–2006), former chief rabbi of the Israel Defense Forces
Yosef Navon (1858–1934), a Jerusalem businessman
Ofira Navon (1936–1993), former First Lady of Israel
Emmanuel Navon (1971- ), a political scientist and lecturer

Concepts
The Navon figure